The Bushbury Electric was an English automobile manufactured by the Star Cycle Factory of Wolverhampton in 1897.  An electric car, it came in three- and four-wheeled models, some of which were controlled by reins.  Power was provided by two large three-speed electric motors placed under the seat, along with the battery.  The vehicle's range was limited.

See also
 List of car manufacturers of the United Kingdom

References
David Burgess Wise, The New Illustrated Encyclopedia of Automobiles.
Bushbury Electric on 3-Wheelers.com

External links
Bushbury Electric at motor-car.co.uk

1890s cars
Defunct motor vehicle manufacturers of England
Electric vehicles introduced in the 19th century
Companies based in Wolverhampton
Vehicle manufacturing companies established in 1897

Cars introduced in 1897